The 1986 by-election in Newry and Armagh was caused by the resignation of incumbent Member of Parliament Jim Nicholson.

Nicholson, along with all sitting Unionist MPs, resigned their Westminster seats in December 1985, to highlight their opposition to the Anglo-Irish Agreement and to use the resultant by-elections to campaign on the issue.

The poll was held on 23 January 1986, and was unusual for a by-election in the turnout being higher than for the preceding general election, however Nicholson was not re-elected, (despite gaining an increase in his own vote) losing his seat to the nationalist SDLP candidate Seamus Mallon. Nicholson also failed to recapture the seat at the following general election.

Result

References

External links
Campaign literature from the by-election

Newry and Armagh by-election
By-elections to the Parliament of the United Kingdom in County Armagh constituencies
By-elections to the Parliament of the United Kingdom in County Down constituencies
Politics of Newry
20th century in County Armagh
20th century in County Down